Miss April, also known as Frøken April, can refer to:

Films
 Miss April (1958 film), a 1958 Swedish film
 Miss April (1963 film), a 1963 Danish film

People
 April Jeanette Mendez (born 1987), American professional wrestler also known by the ring name Miss April

Music
 "Miss April", song by Chantal Kreviazuk from What If It All Means Something, 2002